Piscicoccus intestinalis is a species of bacteria from the family Dermatophilaceae which has been isolated from the gut of the fish Repomucenus richardsonii from Japan.

References

Micrococcales
Bacteria described in 2011
Monotypic bacteria genera